Fort Williams was a supply depot built in early 1814 in preparation for the Battle of Horseshoe Bend. It was located in Alabama on the southeast shore where Cedar Creek meets the Coosa River, near Talladega Springs.

History

Creek War
During the Creek War (part of the larger War of 1812), General Andrew Jackson dispatched Colonel John Williams and the 39th Infantry Regiment from Fort Strother. The regiment brought supplies to the area where Fort Williams would be built and were met there by Jackson. A fort was erected at this site under the direction of topographical engineer Howell Tatum on March 22, 1814 and named for Colonel Williams. The supplies were originally transported down the Coosa River from Fort Armstrong prior to arriving at Fort Strother. The site of Fort Williams was chosen as it was equidistant from Fort Strother to Holy Ground. The majority of Jackson's forces were garrisoned at Fort Williams prior to the Battle of Horseshoe Bend, and blazed a 52-mile trail from the fort to the battle site. Jackson left a small group of men from Brigadier General Thomas Johnson's brigade or George Doherty's brigade at Fort Williams in reserve. After the battle, Jackson returned to Fort Williams on April 2, then marched the forts provisions to Hickory Ground. Jackson remained at Fort Williams for five days prior to marching to Hickory Ground. The soldiers who were killed at Horseshoe Bend were buried in a cemetery at Fort Williams. After William Weatherford surrendered to Jackson at Fort Jackson, Major General Thomas Pinckney took command of the forces at Fort Jackson. A Captain Houck was left in command of Fort Williams after the main force left for Fort Jackson. Pinckney later commanded Jackson to return to Fort Williams and search for any hostile Creeks in the Cahaba River Valley.

In the latter part of 1814, Fort Williams was under the command of Major Jasper Smith and the West Tennessee Milita.

The Jackson Trace, a military road, once connected Fort Strother and Fort Williams.

Postwar
Fort Williams was used as a holding area for Creeks during the Trail of Tears as part of the Indian Removal. An unknown number of Creeks died here due to scarce provisions and were buried in unmarked graves in the adjacent cemetery.

Present
The original site was submerged under Lay Lake with the 1914 construction of the Lay Dam 14 miles downstream. The headstones from the military cemetery were relocated from their original site in 2006 due to the development of a neighborhood.

Units
The 1st, 2nd, and 3rd Regiment of East Tennessee Militia and the 1st and 4th Regiment West Tennessee Militia were stationed at Fort Williams.

References

Sources

External link
 

Pre-statehood history of Alabama
Buildings and structures in Talladega County, Alabama
Williams
Williams
Williams
Williams
Creek War